The Eastbrook is a Grade II* listed public house at Dagenham Road, Dagenham, London.

In listing it at Grade II*, Historic England note its "smart Neo-Georgian exterior with good detailing and materials; design quality: contrasting aesthetic in the Oak and Walnut Bars, which epitomises the pluralistic approach to design in the inter-war years, and nostalgia for 'Merrie England'; planning: an archetypal inter-war improved road house with a range of rooms for different functions and clientele; intactness: virtually unaltered, high-quality interior complete with walnut or oak panelling, glazed partitions, bars, seating, stained glass, and fireplaces; suburban landmark: the pub exemplifies inter-war arterial development."

It is on the Campaign for Real Ale's National Inventory of Historic Pub Interiors.

Eastbrook is also a ward of the London Borough of Barking and Dagenham. The population of the ward at the 2011 Census was 10,506.

References

Grade II* listed buildings in the London Borough of Barking and Dagenham
Grade II* listed pubs in London
National Inventory Pubs
Dagenham
Pubs in the London Borough of Barking and Dagenham